Mahananda Wildlife Sanctuary (Pron: móhɑ́nɑ́ndaa) is located on the foothills of the Himalayas, between the Teesta and Mahananda rivers. Situated in the Darjeeling district of West Bengal, India; it comes under Darjeeling Wildlife division and can be reached from Siliguri in 30 minutes. Sukna, the gateway to the sanctuary, is only 13 km from Siliguri and 28 km from Bagdogra airport. The sanctuary sprawls over 159 km2 of reserve forest and was started as a game sanctuary in 1955. In 1959, it got the status of a sanctuary mainly to protect the Indian bison and royal Bengal tiger, which were facing the threat of extinction.

Geography

The forest type in Mahananda WLS varies from riverain forests like Khayer-Sisoo to dense mixed-wet forest in the higher elevation in Latpanchar area of Kurseong hills. The variation in elevation and forest types helps the existence of a large number of species of mammals, birds and reptiles. Varying elevation from 166 metres at the southern range of Sukna forest to the elevation up to 1,500 metres at Latkothi beat office covers varied vegetation and is home to superb biome restricted species. Latpanchar actually forms the highest part of the Sanctuary, with an average elevation of 1,400 metres.

Note: The map alongside presents some of the notable locations in the subdivision. All places marked in the map are linked in the larger full screen map.

Biodiversity 
Avian fauna listed from this park are of A1, A2 and A3 categories with IBA site code IN-WB-07.

Natural history

Biomes
Inside this wildlife sanctuary, the primary biomes corresponding to the ecoregions are:
 Sino-Himalayan Temperate Forest of the Eastern Himalayan broadleaf forests Biome 7
 Sino-Himalayan Subtropical Forest of the Himalayan subtropical broadleaf forests Biome 8
 Indo-Chinese Tropical Moist Forest of the Himalayan subtropical pine forests Biome 9

All of these are typical forest type of foothills of the Bhutan - Nepal - India hilly region between altitudinal range 166 metres to 1,500 metres.

Fauna
Birds at Mahananda Wildlife Sanctuary includes some very endangered species like Rufous-necked Hornbill, Oriental Pied Hornbill, Great Hornbill etc. Among the others swallow, swift, thrush, babbler, warbler, roller, minivet and sunbird can be found in abundance.

Some exotic species of mammals are reported from this area like Himalayan serow, Himalayan porcupine, Himalayan Black Bear and even more rarer like Binturong and Clouded Leopard. Other important mammalian species include Indian elephants, Indian bison, chital (spotted deer), barking deer, sambar, rhesus monkey, many species of lesser cat like fishing cat and jungle cat, leopard etc.

See also
 Neora Valley National Park
 Gorumara National Park
 Chapramari Wildlife Sanctuary
 Pangolakha Wildlife Sanctuary
 Kyongnosla Alpine Sanctuary

References

External links 

 Mahananda Wildlife Sanctuary Attractions

Wildlife sanctuaries in West Bengal
Tourist attractions in Darjeeling district
Protected areas established in 1976
Dooars
1976 establishments in West Bengal